Oops or OOPS is an interjection made in response to a minor mistake. It may also refer to:

Television and film
 "Oops" (Frasier episode), an episode of the TV sitcom Frasier
 "Oops" (Family Ties episode), an episode of the TV sitcom Family Ties
 Ooops!, a 2002 British Children's Television show
 Ooops! (1970s TV series), a French-Canadian TV comedy series
 Oops! (film), a 2003 Hindi drama film

Music
 "Oops!" (Super Junior song), 2011
 "Oops (Oh My)", a 2002 song by Tweet featuring Missy Elliott
 "Oops", a 1956 Warren and Mercer song performed by Ella Fitzgerald and Louis Armstrong
 "Oops", a 1962 song by Bill Doggett and His Combo
 "Oops", a 1966 song by Neil Christian
 "Oops!", a 1985 song by Rare Silk from American Eyes
 "Oops", a 2016 song by Little Mix from Glory Days
 "Oops!", a 2020 song by Loona from 12:00
 "Oops!", a 2020 song by Yung Gravy from Gasanova

Other
 Linux kernel oops, a response created from the abnormal operation of the Linux kernel
 Out Of Phase Stereo

See also
 
 
 OOP (disambiguation)
 OPS (disambiguation)